HNTV may also refer to:

 Hanoi Radio Television
 Hunan Television
 Henan Television